(All the Children Celebrate Christmas) was the 2013 edition of Sveriges Radio's Christmas Calendar.

Plot
The Svennesson family lives in a flat in Sweden and have 23 children. It's December, and Christmas is approaching.

References
 

2013 radio programme debuts
2013 radio programme endings
Sveriges Radio's Christmas Calendar